ETLA can refer to:

Research Institute of the Finnish Economy, a major Finnish think tank for economic, policy and social studies
Extended three-letter acronym, four-letter acronym, four-letter abbreviation
Enterprise Term License Agreement, a type of license agreement for organizations for Adobe Inc. products.

Etla can refer to:
Etla District, part of the Valles Centrales region of the state of Oaxaca, Mexico.
The town and municipality officially known as Villa de Etla in Oaxaca, Mexico.
The town and municipality officially known as San Agustín Etla in Oaxaca, Mexico.